Florence Lake Dam is a concrete multiple-arch dam on the South Fork of the San Joaquin River, in Fresno County, California in the United States. Its reservoir, Florence Lake, provides for water diversion to Huntington Lake and Big Creek Powerhouses Nos. 1–3 via the  Ward Tunnel.

See also
List of dams and reservoirs in California

References

External links

Dams in California
Historic American Engineering Record in California
Multiple-arch dams
Dams in the San Joaquin River basin
Dams completed in 1926